Parc Sergent Blandan, also shortened to Parc Blandan, is an urban park in the 7th arrondissement of Lyon in Lyon, France, adjacent to Cimetière de la Guillotière Ancien.

The park has three distinct areas: a multi-purpose square to the north, an ecological area to the south, and a central garden that surrounds the barracks' ramparts. The park also contains a large skatepark.

It's the third largest park in Lyon after Parc de la Tête d'or and Parc de Gerland.

See also 
 Parks in Lyon

References

External links 

 
 

7th arrondissement of Lyon
2013 establishments in France
Parks in Lyon